Lee Ho-dong (born ), better known by his stage name Hoya or Lee Ho-won, is a South Korean singer, rapper, songwriter, dancer and actor. He served as a rapper and vocalist in boy band Infinite from 2010 and its sub-group Infinite H from 2013 up until his departure from Woollim Entertainment in 2017. In 2018, Hoya made his solo debut on March 28 with his first mini album "Shower".

Hoya made his acting debut in the drama Reply 1997 (2012) and went on to star in the dramas My Lovely Girl (2014), Mask (2015), Radiant Office (2017), and Two Cops (2017), Devilish Charm (2018).

Biography
Hoya was born in Busan, South Korea. He dropped out of high school during his first year to pursue his dream as a singer. His father was against the decision thus Hoya had to leave home. He then took the high school qualification exam and passed. Later his father accepted him and now supports Infinite whole heartedly. Hoya auditioned after he dropped out and ended up in his current agency, Woollim Entertainment. He was a former JYP Entertainment trainee.

On March 10, 2014, he announced that his real birth name is Lee Hodong, not Howon as he had previously told the public, and that he changed it in order not to share a name with comedian Kang Hodong.

Hoya graduated from Daekyeung University, majoring in Applied Music.

Career

2010: Debut with Infinite 

Hoya debuted as rapper, vocal and main dancer of South Korean boyband Infinite in 2010.  The group officially debuted on June 9, 2010.

2012–2014: Infinite H's debut and acting roles 

Hoya made his acting debut in the tvN drama Reply 1997. The drama was a major hit and raised his popularity.

In September 2012, Hoya and fellow Infinite member Dongwoo formed a subgroup called Infinite H. The subgroup released their first mini-album, titled Fly High, in January 2013.

In 2014, Hoya starred in SBS' music romance drama, My Lovely Girl; which co-stars his fellow Infinite member Kim Myung-soo.

On September 24, 2014, Hoya was cast as the lead role in the film Hiya. He played a high school student who only dreams of becoming a singer. The film premiered on March 10, 2015.

2015–2017: Departure from Infinite, solo activities 
In 2015, Hoya starred in SBS's melodrama Mask, acting as Soo Ae's brother.

In June 2016, Hoya became a contestant in Mnet's dance survival show, Hit The Stage. In December, it was announced that Hoya has been cast in the sitcom Strong Family 2017, which started airing in February 2017.

Hoya was a supporting role in MBC's office drama, Radiant Office. On August 30, it was confirmed that Hoya would not be renewing his contract (which expired June 9, 2017) and would be leaving Infinite as well as Woollim Entertainment. In September, he made his musical debut in Hourglass, a play based on the mega hit Korean drama Sandglass. He then starred in MBC's cop drama,  Two Cops.

2018–present: Solo debut 
In 2018, Lee made his solo debut on March 28 with his first mini album Shower. He was then cast in the romance comedy drama Devilish Charm. In the midst of all, Lee also went to Immortal Song 2 that was broadcast on August 4 and eventually won the episode by getting the highest scores there. Lee also became a dance coach/mentor in KBS variety program, Dancing High that focuses on teaching and mentoring the teens in Korea about dance. On September 12, Lee also released a digital single titled, 'Baby U' featuring Kriesha Chu in the music video.

Hoya enlisted for military service on February 7, 2019, by announcing it through a post two days before the date; he was discharged on December 6, 2020.

On June 9, 2021, Hoya made his comeback with the new digital single album 1AM.

On April 1, 2022, Hoya signed an exclusive contract with Initial Entertainment.

Discography

Extended plays

Single albums

Singles

Songwriting credits

Filmography

Film

Television series

Television shows

Musical theatre

Awards and nominations

References

External links

 
 
 

1991 births
Infinite (group) members
Living people
Musicians from Busan
South Korean male rappers
South Korean hip hop dancers
South Korean male singers
South Korean male idols
South Korean pop singers
South Korean male dancers
South Korean male film actors
South Korean male television actors